My Journey into the Wilds of Chicago is a photo-literary coffee table book authored by Mike MacDonald, with forewords by Bill Kurtis and Stephen Packard. The book is a visual and educational journey through the prairies, savannas, and other natural areas throughout the Chicago metropolitan area.

The book contains more than 200 photographs and nearly two dozen essays and poems written by MacDonald about Chicago's wild side, ranging in geography from the lakefront to prairie lands just north of the border in Wisconsin, to Kankakee, Lockport, Batavia, and McHenry County.

My Journey into the Wilds of Chicago served as the basis for the website ChicagoNatureNow.com!, a website run by MacDonald. The website is a digital catalog of Chicago's forest preserves, and provides updates of the area's natural events.

Reception

The book was positively received, including a review from Publishers Weekly, which said of My Journey into the Wilds of Chicago, "this impressive, cloth-bound debut is a lucid perspective on the prairie and its native plants and animals; it is celebratory, soulful and poetic, evoking a strong affection for Chicago's unchecked wilderness in a city best known for its iconic lakefront and skyscrapers."

References

External links
 
Chicago Nature Now! website 

Coffee table books
Books about Chicago
American travel books
Nature books
Botany handbooks and guides